Ende is the seat capital of the Ende Regency, East Nusa Tenggara province of Indonesia. Ende is located on the southern coast of Flores Island. The town had a population of 87,269 residents at the 2020 census, divided administratively between four districts of the regency – Ende Seletan, Ende Timur, Ende Tengah and Ende Utara.

History

Ende was the site of a kingdom that existed around the end of 18th century. The people of the area therefore known as Lio-Ende people. For many decades Ende has been a center of government, trade, education, and political activities.

Rebellion against the Dutch was led by a certain Nipa Do known as the wars of Watu Api and Mari Longa (1916-1917). In 1934, the nationalist leader, Sukarno, who later became Indonesia's first president was exiled to eastern Indonesia by the Dutch colonial government.

Attractions

The Bung Karno Museum is the old house occupied by Sukarno during his years of exile in Ende. Most of the old furniture are still there. While he was exiled in Ende, Sukarno wrote and held several plays, together with Tonel Kelimutu Theatre Group. Among the plays were Rendorua Ola Nggera Nusa (Rendo that stirred the archipelago) and Doctor Satan, a revision on the story of Dr. Frankenstein.

Near the football field in Ende stands a big breadfruit tree. Under the tree, Sukarno often sat, working on political ideas to lead Indonesia to independence. Those reflections contributed to the opening of Pancasila concept, which is now the state philosophy of Indonesia. From here Pancasila was born. Today, the Pancasila Birth Monument stands on this place.  During a visit to Ende in June 2013, Vice President Boediono spoke of the importance of the idea of Pancasila for Indonesia and officiated over a ceremony to open a monument to the work of Sukarno in Ende.

Another attraction is Christ the King Cathedral, which is the seat of the Roman Catholic Archdiocese of Ende.

While in Ende there is an opportunity to tryout the local type of coffee “Kopi End”'. Coffee beans and ginger toasted together and brewed as normal.

Transportation
The town is served by H. Hasan Aroeboesman Airport or Ende airport.

Climate
Ende has a tropical savanna climate (Köppen Aw) with a long dry season and short wet season.

See also
Ende language (Indonesia)
Li'o language

References

External links

Populated places in East Nusa Tenggara
Flores Island (Indonesia)
Regency seats of East Nusa Tenggara